
Gmina Ostaszewo is a rural gmina (administrative district) in Nowy Dwór Gdański County, Pomeranian Voivodeship, in northern Poland.

Villages
Gmina Ostaszewo contains the villages and settlements of Gniazdowo, Groblica, Jeziernik, Komarówka, Lubiszynek Pierwszy, Nowa Cerkiew, Nowa Kościelnica, Ostaszewo, Palczewo, Piaskowiec and Pułkownikówka.

Neighbouring gminas
Gmina Ostaszewo is bordered by the gminas of Cedry Wielkie, Lichnowy, Nowy Dwór Gdański, Nowy Staw, Stegna and Suchy Dąb.

References
Polish official population figures 2006

Ostaszewo
Nowy Dwór Gdański County